A variable structure system, or VSS, is a discontinuous nonlinear system of the form

Due to the piecewise continuity of these systems, they behave like different continuous nonlinear systems in different regions of their state space. At the boundaries of these regions, their dynamics switch abruptly. Hence, their structure varies over different parts of their state space.

The development of variable structure control depends upon methods of analyzing variable structure systems, which are special cases of hybrid dynamical systems.

See also 
Variable structure control
Sliding mode control
Hybrid system
Nonlinear control
Robust control
Optimal control
H-bridge – A topology that combines four switches forming the four legs of an "H". Can be used to drive a motor (or other electrical device) forward or backward when only a single supply is available. Often used in actuator sliding-mode control systems.
Switching amplifier – Uses switching-mode control to drive continuous outputs
Delta-sigma modulation – Another (feedback) method of encoding a continuous range of values in a signal that rapidly switches between two states (i.e., a kind of specialized sliding-mode control)
Pulse-density modulation – A generalized form of delta-sigma modulation
Pulse-width modulation – Another modulation scheme that produces continuous motion through discontinuous switching

References 

2. Emelyanov, S.V., ed. (1967). Variable Structure Control Systems. Moscow: Nauka.

3. Emelyanov S, Utkin V, Tarin V, Kostyleva N, Shubladze A, Ezerov V, Dubrovsky E. 1970. Theory of Variable Structure Control Systems (in Russian). Moscow: Nauka.

4. Variable Structure Systems: From Principles to Implementation.  A. Sabanovic, L. Fridman and S. Spurgeon (eds.), IEE, London, 2004, ISBN 0863413501.

5. 	Advances in Variable Structure Systems and Sliding Mode Control—Theory and Applications. Li, S., Yu, X., Fridman, L., Man, Z., Wang, X.(Eds.),  Studies in Systems, Decision and Control,v.115, Springer,  2017, ISBN 978-3-319-62895-0

6.Variable-Structure Systems and Sliding-Mode Control. M. Steinberger, M. Horn, L. Fridman.(eds.), Studies in Systems, Decision and Control, v.271, Springer International Publishing, Cham, 2020, ISBN 978-3-030-36620-9.

Further reading 

Y. Shtessel, C. Edwards, L. Fridman, A. Levant. Sliding Mode Control and Observation, Series: Control Engineering, Birkhauser: Basel, 2014, ISBN 978-0-81764-8923

Nonlinear systems
Dynamical systems
Concepts in physics
Nonlinear control